The  Boston Redskins season was the franchise's 5th season in the National Football League. The team finished with a record of seven wins and five losses and finished in first place in the Eastern Division of the National Football League.  
They won their final three games of the regular season to win the division title, the finale was a 14–0 shutout of the New York Giants at the Polo Grounds. The 1936 Boston Redskins finished with a record of 4-3 at home and 3-2 on the road. 

The Redskins hosted the 1936 NFL Championship game against the favored Green Bay Packers, the Western Division champions with a 10–1–1 record and two regular season victories over Boston. The game was moved by owner George Preston Marshall from Fenway Park in Boston to the Polo Grounds in New York City to improve attendance. The Packers won the title game 21–6.

This was the first winning season for the Redskins, as well as their first championship game appearance.  It was also the last season that the Redskins played in Boston; days after the title game, Marshall announced the move to his hometown of Washington, D.C. for the 1937 season.

Schedule

Playoffs

 Because of the failing fan support in Boston, owner George Preston Marshall moved the game to the Polo Grounds in New York City.

Standings

References

Boston Redskins seasons
Boston Redskins
1936 in sports in Massachusetts